Vodiane is a village in Mariupol district in Donetsk region of Ukraine.

The War in Donbass, that started in mid-April 2014, brought both civilian and military casualties.

Demographics
Native language as of the Ukrainian Census of 2001:
Russian 84.21%
Ukrainian 15.79%

References

External links
 Weather forecast for Vodiane (Donetsk region)

Villages in Mariupol Raion